Hanover Street is located in the North End of Boston, Massachusetts.

History

The street is one of the oldest in Boston, and was originally a Native American path, allowing access to the shore, prior to the first European settlement.  In the 17th century, the street was called Orange Tree Lane. In 1708, the street was renamed after the British House of Hanover, heirs to the throne under the Act of Settlement 1701. In 1824, North Street and the former Middle Street became part of Hanover. In the 1950s, the block of Hanover Street between Cross Street and Blackstone Street was demolished to make way for the construction of the Central Artery. This block was reopened in 2004 when the elevated Central Artery was removed as part of the Big Dig and replaced by the Rose Kennedy Greenway. In the 1960s the southern section of Hanover street, from Congress Street to Court Street (now Cambridge Street), was demolished to make way for the construction of Government Center. Hanover Street is now home to many businesses, cafes, churches, and Italian restaurants.  The portion of the street between the Rose Kennedy Greenway and Union Street is closed on Friday and Saturday each week for the Haymarket open-air market.

See also
Boston Harborwalk
St. Stephen's Church, Boston
Rose Kennedy Greenway
North End Parks
Boston Public Market
Blackstone Block Historic District
Freedom Trail
Government Center

Former tenants
 American House (Boston)
Concert Hall (Boston, Massachusetts)
 Michele Felice Cornè, artist, c. 1810s
Cotton Mather lived on Hanover St., 1688-1718
John Mayo
Second Church, Boston

References

Image gallery

External links

 Bostonian Society  has materials related to the street.
 City of Boston Archives. Hanover Street looking from Richmond Street to Prince Street, November 11, 1948
 Library of Congress. Waldron's Casino Theatre, Hanover St. near Scollay Square, Boston, Massachusetts, 1922.
 Library of Congress. Historic American Buildings Survey. Codman Building, 30-48 Hanover Street.

Streets in Boston
Former buildings and structures in Boston
History of Boston
North End, Boston
Government Center, Boston